Berele Chagy (Boris Haggai, 1892-1954) was a cantor and composer.

Biography
Born July 25, 1892 in Dagdo, Russia to Yitzchak and Sheine Chagy, Chagy served as a cantor in Russia (1909-1913), South Africa (1922-1937), and the United States. His last position was at Temple Beth El of Borough Park, ending when he died in 1954. Both his father and his paternal grandfather were cantors in Russia.

Chagy's successor at Beth-El was Moshe Koussevitzky.

Chagy's singing was as a tenor.

Works
Among his cantorial compositions recorded are: Brich Shmei, Tikanto Shabbos, Kol Hashem, Shma Isroel, Mogen Ovos, Tzur Yisroel, V'hu Rachum, Bameh Madlikim, and Hashem Moloch Geus.

References

Hazzans
1892 births
1954 deaths